Prankton SC is a U.S. Virgin Islands soccer club that plays in the St Croix Soccer League. During the 2010–11 season, the club came in fourth place in the competition.

References 
 

Soccer clubs in the United States Virgin Islands